The  International League season took place from April to September 2005.

The Toledo Mud Hens defeated the Indianapolis Indians to win the league championship.

Attendance
Buffalo - 609,092
Charlotte - 289,409
Columbus - 520,104
Durham - 520,371
Indianapolis - 565,653
Louisville - 643,466
Norfolk - 507,674
Ottawa - 160,544
Pawtucket - 688,421
Richmond - 414,959
Rochester - 452,302
Scranton/W.B. - 400,726
Syracuse - 382,625
Toledo - 592,046

Playoffs
The following teams qualified for the postseason:  Buffalo Bisons, Indianapolis Indians, Norfolk Tides, and Toledo Mud Hens.

Division Series
The 2005 IL Playoffs include teams from Indianapolis (Wild Card finalist), Toledo (West Division Champions), Norfolk (South Division Champions) and the defending North Division and IL Champion Buffalo Bisons. Indianapolis defeated Buffalo 3 games to 2 by winning Games 3, 4 and Game 5 in Buffalo. Toledo also advanced in five games.

Championship series
Toledo won the IL title for the first time in nearly 40 years by sweeping the Indians (Indianapolis). All series were best of five.

References

External links
International League official website

 
International League seasons